Psammodius is a genus of aphodiine dung beetles in the family Scarabaeidae. There are at least 3 described species in Psammodius.

Species
 Psammodius basalis (Mulsant & Rey, 1870)
 Psammodius laevipennis Costa, 1844
 Psammodius pierottii Pittino, 1979

References

Further reading

 Arnett, R.H. Jr., M. C. Thomas, P. E. Skelley and J. H. Frank. (eds.). (2002). American Beetles, Volume II: Polyphaga: Scarabaeoidea through Curculionoidea. CRC Press LLC, Boca Raton, FL.
 
 Richard E. White. (1983). Peterson Field Guides: Beetles. Houghton Mifflin Company.

Scarabaeidae